Conchobar Buidhe Mág Tighearnán (anglicised Conor 'The Tawny' McKiernan) was chief of the McKiernan Clan and Baron or Lord of Tullyhunco barony, County Cavan from 1312 until 1314.

Ancestry

Conchobar was the son of Gíolla Íosa 'Leith' Mág Tighearnán, son of Sithric Carrach in Cairn Mág Tighearnán (d.1290), son of Duarcán mac Íomhaor Mág Tighearnán (d.1290), son of Íomhaor mac Tighearnán Mág Tighearnán (died c.1269), son of Tighearnán, son of Duarcán, son of Íomhaor, son of Gíolla Chríost, son of Amhlaoibh, son of Tighearnán, the eponym. His grandfather Sithric 'Carrach-in-Cairn' Mág Tighearnán had been a previous chief of the clan. Conchobar's brothers were Matha Mág Tighearnán (d. 1311) a former chief of the clan, Domhnall 'An Saithnech' Mág Tighearnán (d.1312) whom he succeeded as chief, Tomás Mág Tighearnán (d.1358) who was also a chief of the clan, Duarcán, Cú Chonnacht, Cormac, Fergal 'Cend Craiche' and Mathghamhain (d. 1314).

Description

Conchobar's nickname uidhe meant that he had had either blonde hair or an olive complexion.

Head of the Lineage

On the death of the previous ceann fine, his brother Domhnall an Saithnech Mág Tighearnán in 1312, Conchobar took the chieftaincy and resided in the castle of Croaghan of the Cups (Irish- Cruachan O'Cúbhrán), now in the townland of Coolnashinny, besides the modern town of Killeshandra.

Death

Conchobar was murdered in 1314 in the Battle of Kilmore, County Cavan. His brother Mathghamhain and many other McKiernans were also killed in the battle. Some of the annals give a later date for Conchobar's death.

The Annals of Ulster for 1314 state-

The Annals of the Four Masters for 1317 state-

The Annals of Connacht for the year 1317 state-

The Annals of Loch Cé for the year 1317 state-

The Annals of Clonmacnoise for 1317 state-

References

Irish lords
1314 deaths
People from County Cavan
14th-century Irish people